von Willebrand factor A domain-containing protein 2, also known as A domain-containing protein similar to matrilin and collagen (AMACO), is a protein that in humans is encoded by the VWA2 gene.

AMACO is a member of the von Willebrand factor A-like (VWA) domain containing protein superfamily and consists of three VWA-like domains, two EGF-like domains, a cysteine-rich domain and a unique C-terminal domain.
AMACO is an extracellular matrix protein and mostly deposited adjacent to basement membranes.

AMACO binds directly to FRAS1 which is part of the Fraser complex important for epithelial-connective tissue interaction, the exact biological role of AMACO, however,  is still unknown. In 2005 AMACO was found markedly induced in colon cancers; indicating that it might be a good candidate as a biomarker for this type of cancer.

References

Further reading

External links 
 

Extracellular matrix proteins